Sara Nović (born 1987) is an American writer, translator, and creative writing professor. Nović is also a deaf rights' activist who has written about the challenges she has faced as a deaf novelist.

Nović is most notable for her debut novel, Girl at War, which tells the story of Ana Jurić, a ten-year-old girl whose life is upended by the civil war that resulted in the dissolution of Yugoslavia. The novel was an Alex Awards recipient in 2016. In 2014, Nović was awarded an ALTA Travel Fellowship by the American Literary Translators Association. In addition to publishing her own literary works, Nović has translated poems written by Izet Sarajlić, a renowned Bosnian writer. Nović was awarded the Willis Barnstone Translation Prize in 2013 for her translation of Sarajlić's poem "After I Was Wounded." She is also a recipient of the Alex Awards.

Nović's second book True Biz was released in 2022. The book follows Charlie to River Valley School for the Deaf as she deals with a faulty cochlear implant and meets other deaf people for the first time in her life. The book was chosen as a pick for Reese Witherspoon's book club and was reviewed as "moving, fast-paced and spirited — we have vivid access to all of the main characters’ points of view — but also skillfully educational" by The New York Times.

Nović is a graduate of the MFA program at Columbia University, where she studied fiction and literary translation. She is a fiction editor at Blunderbuss Magazine and serves as the founding editor of the deaf rights' blog Redeafined. Nović also works as an Assistant Professor of Creative Writing at Stockton University.

References

External links 
 Profile at Sara-Novic.com
 Profile at Amazon
 website

1987 births
Living people
American women novelists
Deaf writers
Novelists from New Jersey
21st-century American women writers
21st-century American novelists
21st-century American translators
Columbia University School of the Arts alumni
Columbia University faculty
Fashion Institute of Technology faculty
Stockton University faculty
American deaf people
Novelists from New York (state)
American women academics
American people of Croatian descent